Eremoblatta is a genus of sand cockroaches in the family Corydiidae.

References 

Cockroach genera